Hurin may refer to:

Húrin Thalion, a hero of the First Age in J. R. R. Tolkien's Middle-earth legendarium
Hurin, Iran, a village in Qazvin Province
Hurin, a character in Robert Jordan's The Wheel of Time
Hurin dynasty of Sapa Incas
Silas Hurin, one of the original owners of the land where Lebanon, Ohio was built